The discography of Eric B. & Rakim, an American hip hop duo, consists of four studio albums, five compilation albums, 15 singles, and nine music videos. Eric B. & Rakim formed and signed a record deal with Zakia Records in 1985. The following year, the duo signed a deal with 4th & B'way Records. Their debut album Paid in Full was released in 1987. In the United States, it peaked at number 58 on the Billboard 200, number 8 on R&B/Hip-Hop Albums, and was certified platinum by the Recording Industry Association of America (RIAA). It appeared on the Dutch, New Zealand, and UK Albums Chart. Paid in Full produced five singles, four of which appeared on Hot R&B/Hip-Hop Songs. The fifth single "Paid in Full" (1988) peaked in the top five of the Dutch and New Zealand Singles Chart.

In 1988, Eric B. & Rakim released their second studio album Follow the Leader. It peaked at number 22 on the Billboard 200, number 7 on R&B/Hip-Hop Albums, and was certified gold by the RIAA. The album peaked at 25 on the UK Albums Chart, and appeared on the Swedish, Dutch, and New Zealand Albums Chart. Three songs from the album were released as singles: "Follow the Leader", "Microphone Fiend", and "The R", the first and last of which appeared on Hot R&B/Hip-Hop Songs. The duo's third studio album Let the Rhythm Hit 'Em was released in 1990. It peaked at number 32 on the Billboard 200, number 10 on R&B/Hip-Hop Albums, and was certified gold by the RIAA. The album appeared on the UK and Dutch Albums Chart. Let the Rhythm Hit 'Em spawned three singles, including the title track and "In the Ghetto", both of which peaked within the top 10 on US Hot Rap Tracks.

Don't Sweat the Technique (1992) was the duo's fourth studio album. It peaked at number 22 on the Billboard 200 and number 9 on R&B/Hip-Hop Albums. It appeared on the UK Albums chart. Four songs, all of which appeared in the top 40 on R&B/Hip-Hop Songs, were released as singles from the album. The title track, released as the third single, topped Hot Rap Tracks. In 1992 after Don't Sweat the Technique, Eric B. & Rakim disbanded. From 2001 to 2010, five compilation albums have been released: 20th Century Masters – The Millennium Collection: The Best of Eric B. & Rakim (2001), Classic (2003), Gold (2005), Repaid in Full: The Paid in Full Remixed (2008), and Rarities Edition: Paid in Full (2010). None of these albums charted.

Albums

Studio albums

Compilation albums

As lead artist

As featured artist

Music videos

As featured artist

References

External links

Hip hop discographies
Discographies of American artists